The Ministry of National Defense of Uruguay is a ministry of the Government of Uruguay that is responsible for coordinating and executing all civil and military activities aimed at preserving the sovereignty, independence and the peace of the country. It is the administrative and executive body of the Armed Forces of Uruguay.

The Ministry is headquartered in the 8 de Octubre Avenue in Barrio Tres Cruces, Montevideo. The current Minister of Defense is Javier García Duchini, who has held the position since March 1, 2020.

History 
The General Constituent and Legislative Assembly established after the Preliminary Peace Convention of 1828 appointed José Rondeau as Provisional Governor. On December 22, Rondeau appointed Colonel Eugenio Garzón as Minister of War and Navy, this being the first government department dedicated to the administration of the militia in the newly created Uruguayan State.

In 1933 this government department adopted the current name of Ministry of National Defense of Uruguay. In 1987, the headquarters were installed in the old Blixen de Castro Residence on 8 de Octubre Avenue, in barrio Tres Cruces.

On March 1, 2005, Azucena Berrutti became the first woman to hold the position of defense minister in Uruguay. On April 1, 2019, President Tabaré Vázquez dismissed Minister Jorge Menéndez and the entire Defense leadership after a scandal resulting from the Special Honor Court that tried José Nino Gavazzo.

Armed Forces 

 National Army 
 Air Force
 National Navy

Structure 

 Estado Mayor de la Defensa: Defense General Staff
 Dirección Nacional de Inteligencia de Estado (es): National Directorate of State Intelligence
 Hospital Central de las Fuerzas Armadas: Central Hospital of the Armed Forces
 Dirección General de los Servicios de las Fuerzas Armadas (es): General Directorate of Armed Forces Services
 Centros de Altos Estudios Nacionales (es): National High Studies Centers
 Instituto Antártico Uruguayo (es): Uruguayan Antarctic Institute
 Dirección Nacional de Meteorología (es): National Directorate of Meteorology
 Dirección Nacional de Pasos de Frontera: National Border Crossing Directorate
 Supremo Tribunal Militar: Supreme Military Court
 Dirección General de Infraestructura Aeronáutica: General Directorate of Aeronautical Infrastructure

Headquarters 
Its current headquarters is the General Artigas Building, formerly known as the Blixen de Castro Residence. The department settled there in 1987 after the democratic transition. The building was designed by the French architect Joseph Carré and dates from the 1910s.

References

External links 

 Official website
 

National Defense
Uruguay
Military of Uruguay